Champi-Tortu is a 1921 French silent film directed by Jacques de Baroncelli. The film was based on a novel by Gaston Chérau.

Cast
Pierre Alcover   
René Alexandre   
Cosnard
Paul Duc
Henri Janvier
Paul Jorge
Maria Kouznetzoff
André René
Madame Trefeuil

External links 

1921 films
French silent feature films
French black-and-white films
Films directed by Jacques de Baroncelli
French drama films
Silent drama films
1920s French films

1921 drama films